Metomen may refer to:

Places
Metomen, Wisconsin, town, United States
Metomen (community), Wisconsin, unincorporated community, United States